Liu To Bridge is a bridge over the valley of Liu To, Tsing Yi Island, Hong Kong. It is part of Tsing Yi Road West. The structure is numbered N547 by Hong Kong Government.

Built between 1985 and 1987, it spans  and is a 3-span bridge with dual 2-lane road. As Liu To is a steep-side valley, in order to avoid temporary work on the valley floor, twin prestressed concrete boxes were stacked incrementally during the construction to provide a short section across the valley.

See also
List of tunnels and bridges in Hong Kong
Bridges of Tsing Yi

References

Bridges in Hong Kong
Tsing Yi
Bridges completed in 1987
1987 establishments in Hong Kong